Wouter Kellerman (born 20 September 1961) is a GRAMMY winning South African flautist, producer and composer who has won eight South African Music Awards. Using his classical training as a foundation, Kellerman has focused his attention on World and Roots music, exploring the versatility of the instrument and fusing classical and contemporary sounds.

Kellerman received a Grammy Award at the 57th Annual Grammy Awards for his 2014 album Winds of Samsara, a collaboration with Indian composer and producer Ricky Kej. Winds of Samsara reached No. 1 on the US New Age Album Billboard Charts and also peaked at No. 1 on the ZMR (Zone Music Reporter) Top 100 Radio Airplay Chart in the month of July 2014.

Kellerman's Love Language (2015) received a Grammy® Nomination for 'Best Contemporary Instrumental Album', and won a SAMA for 'Best Instrumental and/or Classical Album'. It debuted at nr. 1 on the World Music Billboard charts in July 2015. This album also featured at No. 1 on the ZMR Top 100 International Radio Airplay Chart in August 2015, and spent 11 weeks in the CMJ New World Top 40 Chart, peaking at nr. 12.

His next adventure was a collaboration with the Soweto Gospel Choir, Symphonic Soweto – A Tribute to Nelson Mandela. The album sees the two Grammy® winners re-conceptualise traditional music, freedom songs (including Mandela favourite, “Lizalis’idinga”) and popular songs by South African legends (including Brenda Fassie, Lucky Dube and Miriam Makeba), from a symphonic and choral perspective – as part of honouring Nelson Mandela in the year he would have celebrated his 100th birthday. Symphonic Soweto won the 2018 SAMA for Best Adult Contemporary Album - Kellerman's seventh SAMA recognition. From Symphonic Soweto, Kellerman's collaborative composition Soweto Travels won the USA Songwriting Competition for Best Instrumental Composition in 2017.

As part of his mission to work with and uplift children, Kellerman collaborated with the Ndlovu Youth Choir (a rural choir based in Moutse in the Limpopo province of South Africa) in 2018. Their African version of Ed Sheeran's Shape of You became an internet sensation, going viral with tens of millions of views on social media, and winning awards like the HMMA (Hollywood Music in Media Awards) for 'Best Independent Music Video' - pushing the Ndlovu Youth Choir firmly into the international limelight. This resulted in America's Got Talent scouting the choir to enter the 2019 competition. Ndlovu went ahead and delivered a sensational first few rounds, going all the way through to the finals of the competition, showcasing South African music and spirit in the process. Their collaboration is part of Kellerman's 2019 album In A Different Light, in which he re-imagines and re-shapes some of his favourite melodies by approaching them from a fresh angle.

Kellerman received his third GRAMMY® nomination for Pangaea, his collaborative album with David Arkenstone in 2021. He received his second GRAMMY® win for his song Bayethe with South African artists Nomcebo Zikode and Zakes Bantwini in the Best Global Music Performance category.

Performance highlights 

 Kellerman performed at the closing ceremony of the 2010 Soccer World Cup for 700 million people.
 Performed at the Joy of Jazz Festival in Johannesburg in 2010, 2016 and 2022.
 Performed at the 2017 Byron Bay Bluesfest in Australia.  
 Performed at the South African/Russia Cultural Season in St Petersburg in Russia in November 2017  
 Performed at the 2010 Expo in Shanghai, China
 Performed at the 2010 opening of Midem in Cannes, France. Midem is the world's biggest music conference.
 Performed at the Kennedy Center in Washington DC in 2012 and 2015
 Performed at Carnegie Hall in NYC in October 2014, October 2015 and November 2019
 Performed at the Woodford Folk Festival in Australia in 2013/2014
 Performed at the Rajasthan International Folk Festival in Jodhpur, India in October 2015 and 2018
 Performed for the President of India in December 2015
 Performed in Johannesburg for the visiting Prime Minister of India, Narendra Modi and a television audience of more than 200 million people in June 2016.
 Performed in Kuwait at the Al Yarmouk Theater on 17 April 2019, at a show coordinated by the South African Embassy.
 Performed at the Dubai Expo in Dubai in October 2021, opening Heritage Week for South Africa. 
 Performed as soloist with the South African Mzansi National Philharmonic Orchestra and conductor Marin Alsop in Johannesburg, Durban and Cape Town in December 2022  

Kellerman's flute-playing can be heard on the soundtrack of the Emmy Award-winning film Eye of the Leopard.

Philanthropy 
Kellerman has sponsored the living expenses of 10 children in the SOS Children's Village in Ennerdale, South Africa for the past 20 years and has also financed the building of a house in the SOS Children's Village in Rustenburg. For his continued efforts in helping give these children a better life, Kellerman was nominated by the SOS Children's Villages for the 2007 Inyathelo Special Recognition Award for Philanthropy. He continues to facilitate the teaching of young dance and music students.

Wouter is a Musical Ambassador for Project Peace on Earth

Nominations and awards

Albums 
 Colour (2007)
 Two Voices (2010)
 Half Moon (2012)
 Mzansi (2013)
 Winds of Samsara (2014)
 Love Language (2015)
 Symphonic Soweto, a Tribute to Nelson Mandela (2017)
In A Different Light (2019)
We've Known All Times (2020)
Pangaea (2021)

References

External links
Official Website
Wouter Kellerman on Weekend Breakfast with Refiloe Mpakanyane

20th-century South African musicians
1961 births
Living people
21st-century South African musicians
Male musicians
Musicians from Johannesburg
Grammy Award winners
20th-century male musicians
21st-century male musicians